Agiasos is a small town and a former municipality on the island of Lesbos, North Aegean, Greece. Since the 2019 local government reform, it became a municipality unit that is part of the municipality Mytilene. The municipal unit has an area of 79.924 km2. It is known for its special bright green landscape, its narrow cobbled streets lined by ranks of tiled-roof houses, the traditional architecture and its restless and religious inhabitants. Agiasos, the artistic and religious centre of the island, is a preserved settlement that has many to offer to visitors. The reading society of Anaptixi, a local cultural institution, was established in 1894, when the village was still under Turkish rule. Today it has a great library, a theatre hall, a folklore museum and an active organization which tries to continue the traditions that were passed by the old inhabitants.

History 

The history of the village (population 2,498 in 2001 census) is identified with the history of Panayia of Ayasos (the Greek word for Virgin Mary of Agiasos).

About 1,200 years ago, during the Byzantine Era, toward the end of the 8th century, it was a time of the wars of iconoclasm. In Constantinople, Aghathon the Ephesian, priest of the Chapel of the Palaces, who was an iconophile, fell into the disfavour of Emperor Leo I and was self-exiled to Jerusalem. In early 802, Aghathon heard that Empress Irene of Athens, who was also an iconophile, lived in exile on Lesvos island. Wishing to meet her and be nearer to Constantinople, he sets off for Lesvos, taking with him an icon of "Panayia I Vrefokratousa" (Madonna and the Holy Infant), a Silver Cross with wood from the True cross, a manuscript Gospel, and other relics.

He arrived on the island. Meanwhile, Irene of Athens had died. Aghathon followed the current of a stream and reached a remote wooded area which was a safe environment in which to stay. This site in Carya, where the chapel of Zoodochos Pigi (the life-giving source) with the Holy Water stands today, is where Aghathon hid the Holy Relics and built his hermitage.

He became familiar with the local inhabitants of the nearby villages of Karyni and Penthili, and gained their trust and respect. He revealed his secret and vows that the icon of Panayia (Our Lady) – measuring  – was painted on wax and mastic by Luke the Evangelist. The icon bore the inscription "Mitir Theou, Agia Sion", that is, "Mother of God, Holy Sion". In those times, Jerusalem was called "Agia Sion". With the passage of time, the small, humble hermitage evolved into a monastery, where devout men from the neighboring villages came to live.

The elderly Aghathon died on February 2, in the year 830. The monks, respecting his last wish, continued to keep the icon of Our Lady and the other relics in the monastery crypt. The monks feared the iconoclasts and pirates who ravaged the islands and coastal towns of Asia Minor. In 842, Orthodoxy triumphed and holy icons were raised all over the territory of the Byzantine Empire. From then on the hermitage of Agathon became a pilgrimage site. The icon of Panayia by Luke the Evangelist became renowned, not merely on the island, but all over facing Aeolis. Two pilgrimages to Agia Sion were equivalent to one pilgrimage to the Holy Land.

The Church of Panayia (Our Lady)

The first church of Panayia

In 1170, Constantinos Valerios granted the monks of Karya permission to erect the Church of Panayia on the elevation where the holy relics of Aghathon lay. The church survived 636 years. A small settlement named Agia Sion (Agiasos) developed around the church. This settlement gradually grew, becoming an important provincial town. When the island was subjugated by the Ottoman Turks, many Christian families sought refuge inside the protective walls of the Church of Panayia.

In 1701 a Sultan's firman (decree) vested Ayasos the right not to pay taxes. The Turkish Governor of the region, whose headquarters were in Sykounta, fell seriously ill. In despair, he agreed to be incensed and aspersed with the Holy Water of Zoodhochos Pigi, and he was saved by a miracle. The Ottoman Governor was so taken by enthusiasm and gratitude that he felt the need to make a very valuable offering to the Church of Our Lady, however this was forbidden by the Koran. So, he went to Constantinople and passed a firman (decree) exempting the inhabitants of Agiasos the obligation to pay taxes to the Ottoman government or to the Dignitaries of Mytilene. This exemption was a strong incentive for inhabitants from the vicinity to move to Agiasos in order to avoid tax-paying.

Agiasos became a renowned centre of handicraft. In 1729 the number of families in the village had risen to 500.

The firman was abolished in 1783.

The second church of Panayia

However the church was now very old and derelict so it had to be torn down. In 1806 reconstruction work was initiated by the Metropolite of Mytilene Ieremios and the dignitaries of Agiasos. A new church was built in its place, only larger than the first, despite the strict Order issued by the Turkish authorities stipulating that the new church had to be built exactly where the old foundations lay. The work to decorate the exterior and interior of the church took many years to complete. The décor of the interior of this church, like the first church, was very heavy, so rich it was in offerings made by the believers. The church acquired a number of fine ecclesiastical wood carvings, such as its iconostasis, throne, pulpit and the icon-stands.

The third church of Panayia

The craftsmen were still working on the wood carving when suddenly, on the 6th night of August 1812, the church went up in flames in the great fire that destroyed a large section of the town. Fortunately, all but one icon on the iconostasis were salvaged. The only icon that was destroyed was the icon of Our Lord. Indescribable was the sorrow and anguish of the devout Christians of Agiasos and the deep mourning all over the island at the loss of such a unique monument of the Christian faith.

Nonetheless, the donations which believers of Agiasos offered and the fund-raisers initiated by the Metropolite of Mytilene Callinicus and his emissaries who carried his word to the rural areas and to the opposite coasts of Asia Minor, enabled a third church, which is still standing today, to be built in 1815.

Sultan Mahmud II granted permission for the church to be built as requested by the inhabitants of Agiasos, on condition that the size of the building would not exceed that of the previous one. This three-aisle basilica had three apses and three Lord's Tables; the one on the right was dedicated to Saint Charalampus, and the one on the left to Saint Nicholas.

Almost all of the glebes had to be sold in order to finance the reconstruction work of the Church. In 1816 a second fund-raiser was held among the Christians in the towns and villages of Aeolis, in order to finance the completion of the interior decoration work. The construction of the iconostasis, the throne and pulpit by fine craftsmen lasted twenty years.

The church of Panayia contains offerings and treasures of priceless worth. Icons from Byzantine and Post-Byzantine era adorn the church.

A second fire, which broke out in 1877, almost destroyed the entire village. However, the church remained intact. Up until then, the upper section of the houses that projected onto the narrow roads were made of wood. After the fire these houses were rebuilt, only this time the upper section was made of stone rather than wood and the roads were widened. The village took its present form.

Agiasos has a population of 2,500 permanent residents, while it had 8,000 in the 1960s.

The 'Paniyiri' of Panayia (The festival / feast day of Our Lady)

The feast day of Panayia takes place on 15 August. Pilgrims begin arriving weeks before the 15th not only from Lesbos but from all over Greece in order to spend the first fortnight of August ("dekapentizo") in the monk cells or camp out in the churchyard. A carnival-like atmosphere slowly builds up, peaking on the eve of the feast day.

The pilgrims arrive by all means of transportation. In fact many pilgrims walk all the way to Ayasos from Mytilene and other villages on the island, admiring the scenery along the way on the warm summer night in August. Most of the pilgrims walking to Ayasos make a stop at Karyni, in order to catch their breath and cool off under the shade of the perennial plane trees joining in the traditional festivities and merry-making. At this point of the walking trip the more daring and determined pay special tribute to the icon of Panayia Vrefokratousa by taking the old cobblestone path called "patomeni", a shortcut through the olive groves leading to Agiasos. The village comes alive with ceremony on the eve of the Feast Day of Panayia (15 August). The town of Mytilene is literally a ghost town for a couple of days, since everybody has set off for Agiasos in order to promenade and frolic through the cobbled lanes around the church, the squares and the Garden of Panayia. This large religious celebration/market fair attracts many stall-holders who display their merchandize anywhere they can, and the shop-keepers advertise their local products such as halva, sour apples, pears as best they can, while the spicy fragrance of oregano and aromatic leaves of sage are there.

Many people are still awake when dawn breaks and the fresh morning breeze blows from the mountain. The festive atmosphere is unique for all those who happen to experience it.

On the feast day of Panayia, after the observance, the holy icon is circulated around the church.

Monuments - Sights

 The church of Panayia, a major tourist attraction on the island, is a three-aisle basilica, surrounded by high walls since it was once a monastery. Inside, in front of the iconostasis, on an inclined support stands the miracle working icon of Our Lady dating from the 4th century AD. It was brought to Agiasos from Jerusalem by the monk Aghathon the Ephesian. Directly above a silver gilt replica of the icon dating from the 12th century AD. A number of old icons dating from the Byzantine era are set on the ledges of the iconostasis. For more information about the Church, see “History of the village”.
 "The Garden of Our Lady" is a cool area with a lovely view of the village from below. Here stands the 600-year-old towering plane tree with its enormous branches, under which Eleftherios Venizelos is said to have danced.
 The chapel of "Holy Apostles" (Agii Apostoli), located inside the yard walls of the Church of Panayia is of remarkable architecture, and the chapel of the "life-giving source" (Zoodhochos Piyi), where, legend says, Aghathon the Ephesian, the monk who brought the miracle-worker icon of Panayia from Agiasos, built his hermitage during the Iconoclast times.
 The church of the Holy Trinity, the second largest church in Ayasos, is located in the Kampoudi area in the upper entrance of the village. Built in 1870, it is a replica of the Church of Panayia and other Basilicas of the 18th century. The church has many remarkable icons, some of which date back to the 17th century. Noteworthy is the small but elegant church bell tower.
The church's fair is held on the feast day of the Holy Spirit, marking the beginning of summer for all village activities. Access to the church is easiest by taking the upper entrance to the village, is found if you turn left at the crossroad leading to Megalochori.

 The Market Square lined with neoclassical style coffee houses ("kafeneio").
Here stands two picturesque little church among flower gardens and vegetable patches, one of which is dedicated to the Archangel. Ruins of a medieval fortification can also be seen.
 Just before the ascent to Agiasos, there is the Reservoir of Karyni, plunged in perennial planes dating from the Roman times. One of these planes is a tourist attraction because of the enormity of its hollow.
 Folk Art Museum. The museum operates from January to December and is located in the Church yard. One of the exhibits is the life-size model of a room in a traditional house of Ayasos. The museum collections include fine works of folk art (embroidery, textile works, traditional costumes, old copperware etc.), old jewelry which are pilgrims’ offerings to the church (rings, bracelets, ear-rings, brooches, barrettes etc.), an old coin collection etc. An "Ayasotiki ghonia" (traditional corner of Agiasos) is exhibited at the Museum.
 Ecclesiastical Museum. The museum operates in the Church yard. Its collection items include: The Holy Rood made with wood from the True Cross, the sacred relics of the Saints, holy vessels, old hanging oil-lamps (18th century), a stole embroidered with gold (ecclesiastical vestment) (16th century), an embroidered epitaph of Panayia (Our Lady), embroidered testers (canopy over altar or pulpit) an old icon-stand, an old piece of Venetian furniture, etc.

Folk art

Ceramics 

The history of the art of ceramics in Agiasos is as old as the history of the town itself.

The arrival of the icon of Our Lady and the other relics to the island on the one hand, and the foundation of the monastery on the other, contributed to transforming Agiasos into a place of pilgrimage. This pilgrimage attracted thousands of believers, especially during the Turkish Rule. Thus, production of pottery such as water pitchers, plates, etc., in order to meet the demands of the throngs of devout Christians.

Nowadays, a new series of pottery products has been introduced; small fonts (receptacles for holy water) used by the pilgrims to transport the holy water to their homes and other clay knickknacks and souvenirs.

It is noteworthy to say that, this increased demand for production combined with the migration to Agiasos of a great number of craftsmen from Çanakkale in Asia Minor, have contributed to a greater development of the art of ceramics in Agiasos than in the eastern areas of the island.

Due to these special circumstances, potters and other craftsmen have established trade unions, known as “sinafia”. A money box dating from 1864 is evidence of the existence of the “sinafia” of Agiasos.

However the flourishing art of ceramics in Agiasos, is slowly diminishing along with the old way of life, as a consequence of new needs society and introduction of new, more resistant materials in the market.

Thus, while 40 years ago there were 10 pottery workshops, only two operate today.

Still, the presence of art of ceramics in the town is apparent anyone who visits the town. The unique feature of the art of pottery in Agiasos is the multitude of small objects created to serve solely ornamental purposes. The themes portrayed on these objects are usually borrowed from the scenes of daily life in Agiasos, such as loaded donkeys, shepherds, women spinning wool, pitcher-whistles for little children – toys that whistle when water is added etc.

In the by-gone days, these potters created their clayware without the use of a potter's wheel. Today they use plaster casts (molds). Once the finishing touches are added to the product eliminate all traces left by the mold, the objects are painted with colours that are true to the prototypes that they portray.

Wood carving 

The traditional art of woodcraft using olive and walnut tree wood is particularly developed. Their carved icons and furniture of Agiasos which are hand wrought are displays of fine artistry for which wood carvers of Agiasos are famous.

The tradition of woodcarving is said to have its origins among the craftsmen who created the wood-carved iconostasis of the Church of Panayia in 1812. Originally these craftsmen were the Greeks of Asia Minor, who had astute apprentices from Agiasos to whom they passed on their trade and who inherited their legacy. The families of the “Sentoukadhes” (chest-makers) were named after the trade of some of their members were chest-makers who made fine “sentoukia” (chests/trunks). A large number of houses in Agiasos are decorated with old furniture (mainly chests) which are decorated with carved fretwork designs.

During the postwar times, Dhimitris Kamaros, the grandson of a wood-carver, carried on this trade. Most of today’s young carvers were his apprentices. Each of these fine carvers have evolved and developed their own personal style and personality.

Folklore tradition

There is a particularly rich folklore tradition in Agiasos.

The cultural lighthouse is the Reading Society "I ANAPTIXI" (development) the influence of which goes far beyond the town itself. The island was still under Turkish Domination, the Reading Society expressed the need of certain restless intellectuals for cultivation and information, through books and newspapers. Then in 1894 a night school, amateur theatre company, and choir which organised music – literary nights.

It was a nucleus of national uplifting and offered significant support to the Macedonian Struggle. Its activity and presence in the cultural and artistic life of Ayasos is significant up to our days. The Reading Society which is housed in a private building complex, just outside the lower entrance to the town, includes: a Library with over 20,000 volumes of old and new books on all every fields of science, a large reading room, a theatre for theatrical performances and screening of films, a folklore museum and an exhibition room with a permanent collection of paintings.

The Arts department stages a large number of plays of both foreign and Greek playwrights (In fact many are from Ayasos). Since 1954 the Reading Society has staged more than 35 theatrical plays. Some of its performances have been staged in Mytilene and almost all other villages of Lesvos, in Athens, Piraeus and even as far away as Australia, always with tremendous success.

The Chairman, Panos Pratsos, has been the soul of the Reading Society for the past forty five years. His knowledge and love for music resulted in the establishment of a Music department and the Children's Choir, which often make appearances. Lectures and literary events are also organised by the Reading Society.

Carnival 

Agiasos is the site of the Carnival of Lesvos, where thousands of people visit every year to take part in its festivities. The carnival of Agiasos differs from the carnivals of the rest of Greece because of its eccentricity, mordacity and witty satyres (iambic fifteen syllable verse) expressed by the folk poet in the vernacular of Agiasos.

The Carnival’s history begins in the times of the Turkish Domination and continues to this day. In the course of its century-old history this custom went through a number of stages as it was influenced by countless events and evolved with each historical time. Today it retains the form it took during the post-war period, that is, a folklore event with distinct theatrical elements held in open air, creating a thematic unity combining satiric verses and carnival floats. Its folk muse themes cover a broad spectrum. A famous myth is usually chosen, through which the current socio-political situation is portrayed by using allegorical representation and symbolism. Public figures and current affairs issues are satirized through parallelism. The folk poet does not to go about merrymaking in disguise during the festival just to amuse his audience, but seeks to inspire, to set an example, to cauterize the decayed section of the social body with the thermocautery of his fountain pen. The folk poet is not prudish, instead, he lashes out mercilessly against all that is wrong or unjust, he speaks his mind and is honest. He is daring and prophetic. He does not fear or compromise, nor does he come out in favor of anyone. His caustic sauciness is like an injection used to treat an ailing social body.

There are close correlation between the carnival of Agiasos and the cultural creation and tradition of ancient Greece. The Carnival is a tragic figure. It tries to deal with the buffets of fate by mocking its own trials, it manages to get the society to laugh about its own farrago of sufferings, in order to be able to bear them both in body and soul and ultimately to survive. These carnivals were bacchic festivals devoted to the worship of Dionysus, where eternal recreation, fertility and regeneration of nature during spring were exalted. They were characterised by the dionysian orgy of those initiated to divine worship, by which it was believed achieved catharsis of the soul, spiritual renewal and the exaltation caused by perfection of unearthly life.

The carnival of today preserved relics of the bacchic perception of life such as the “tripsimata”, songs of rhyming couplets that are a hymn to the genitals and the “im’ tzouromata” of those who “archionti” (the word archiomi, is derived from the ancient Greek verb “orchoumai” which means to participate in an orcho (pool), to dance, to take part in the circle of those initiated to the Dionysian worship, whose bodies were painted with tartar, the residue of the grapes and wine, which were red).

The Carnival of Agiasos is a vivid cultural symbol. It is a unique sample of local folk cultural and artistic creation on the national scale. Despite the fact that it receives little support by the State, the carnival manages to survive, thanks to the sacrifices and will of the people of Agiasos.

Traditional costume 

The distinctive feature of the traditional costume of Ayasos dating from the 18th century, are the pleated bloomers or breeches called a “salvari”. This loose fitting garment was worn in a number villages on the island, e.g. Plomari. These bloomers are usually six-leaved, with a width of three leaves. The material covering the inner part of the legs, from the crotch to below the knee named “kalamovrakia” or “klapatses” - are longer than the middle section i.e. the seat of the (bloomers).

The length of the bloomer leg in relation to the seat of the bloomers varied according to the woman’s height. The snugness of the fit depended on the how correct these measurements were. The bloomer legs, which were often made from a plain fabric for reasons of thrift, were gathered below the knee. The bloomer leg cuffs had eyelets through which crocheted cordons called “vrakothilies” were passed, thus ensuring the pleated material fit snugly around the ankles.

The features that made the bloomers of Agiasos special, particularly those worn by young women, are the textiles from which they were made, the colour of the dyes created warm colours such as red and yellow. The warmth of the tartan and striped designs that were more vivid in combinations of white and the various shades of “geranium” red, dark blue and green.

Another feature of the bloomer was the puffed effect created by the “overstuffing” by two, three or more pairs of underpants, of the same or smaller size which were worn under the outer garment. These underpants or “katovrakia” as the people of Agiasos call them and an underskirt were worn next to the skin and were indispensable especially for an appearance on a special occasion.

These clothing accessories insured there was enough volume to create a plasticity effect and thus highlight a plethoric femininity, according to aesthetic views of the time. The traditional garment was supplemented by a camisole and a brocade bolero worn over the young woman’s Sunday-best shirt.

From the first decades of the 20th century, European fashion reached the villages of the island and influenced aesthetic tastes to such a degree that the local traditional garment was gradually put aside. The higher social classes were, as one would expect, the first to forsake the traditional costume, purchasing their garments from Constantinople, Smyrna and other centres of fashion abroad.

This trend was more popular in the town of Mytilene. Close-pleated skirts were now considered to be very fashionable. The bright-coloured textile bloomers were now a thing of the past. Nevertheless, some of the elderly women of highland Ayasos can still be seen wearing their traditional “vraka” (bloomers).

Today even farmers’ wives who now follow the trends of fashion, wear the special bloomer (salvari) when they work in the fields during the winter. They put on their traditional bloomer or a less intricate version which is somewhat more easily worn, and take to the slopes for the olive or chestnut harvest. Though it has now become a museum item, this well preserved traditional garment, the “salvari” is still worn by women both young and old during the olive and walnut cultivation.

Gallery

References

External links
Infos For Agiasos
Agiasos Travel Guide
The Municipality of Agiasos

Populated places in Lesbos